Alfred Hillebrandt (15 March 1853, in Groß Nädlitz – 18 October 1927, in Deutsch-Lissa) was a German Sanskrit scholar.

Biography
He studied Sanskrit and comparative linguistics at the University of Breslau as a student of Adolf Friedrich Stenzler, then continued his studies at the University of Munich under Martin Haug. In 1883 he became an associate professor at Breslau, where in 1887 he attained a full professorship. On two separate occasions he served as university rector.

His specialty was Vedic mythology. "Varuna und Mitra, ein Beitrag Zur Exegese des Veda" (Breslau, 1877) was a prologue to his great work "Vedische Mythologie" (1891-1902), which was later translated into English and published as "Vedic mythology". Hillebrandt also wrote: 
 Das altindische Neu- und Vollmondsopfer (The ancient Indian new and full moon sacrifices, 1880).
 Vedachrestomathie (Vedic chrestomathy, 1885). 
 A section on religious antiquities in Georg Bühler's Grundriss der indo-arischen Philologie und Altertumskunde (1897).
 Alt-Indien, Kulturgeschichtliche Skizzen (Historical culture sketches of ancient India, 1899).

References

1853 births
1927 deaths
Members of the Prussian House of Lords
German philologists
German Indologists
Ludwig Maximilian University of Munich alumni
University of Breslau alumni
Academic staff of the University of Breslau
People from Wrocław County
German male non-fiction writers